

Gmina Sokołów Małopolski is an urban-rural gmina (administrative district) in Rzeszów County, Subcarpathian Voivodeship, in south-eastern Poland.

Villages
Apart from the town of Sokołów Małopolski, Gmina Sokołów Małopolski contains the villages and settlements of Górno, Kąty Trzebuskie, Markowizna, Nienadówka, Trzeboś, Trzebuska, Turza, Wólka Niedźwiedzka and Wólka Sokołowska.

Neighbouring gminas
Gmina Sokołów Małopolski is bordered by the gminas of Czarna, Głogów Małopolski, Kamień, Leżajsk, Nowa Sarzyna, Rakszawa, Raniżów and Trzebownisko.

References
Polish official population figures 2006

Sokolow Malopolski
Rzeszów County